The 1913 North Texas State Normal football team represented North Texas State Normal College (now known as the University of North Texas) as an independent during the 1913 college football season. Led by first-year head coach J. W. Pender, the squad compiled an overall record of 0–1.

Schedule

References

North Texas State Normal
North Texas Mean Green football seasons
North Texas State Normal football